Madhuravani was a scholar and poet who lived in Thanjavur during the reign of the Thanjavur Nayak king Raghunatha Nayak (r. 1600-34). She is widely renowned for her Sanskrit translation of Raghunatha's Ramayana kavya. She also wrote many other Sanskrit works such as Kumarasambhavam and Naishadham. Tharu and Lalita says that she "could compose poetry in three languages and was an expert in ashtavadhanam (the capacity to attend to eight different intellectual activities at the same time)."

References 

 
Tharu and Lalita (Eds.) Women Writing in India.  New York:  The Feminist Press, 1991.  

Year of birth missing
Year of death missing
Sanskrit poets
People from Thanjavur district